The Class C58 is a 2-6-2 wheel arrangement steam locomotive type built by the Japanese Government Railways (JGR) and Japanese National Railways (JNR) from 1938 to 1947. A total of 427 Class C58 locomotives were built and designed by Hideo Shima . Two members of the class are preserved in working order.

Preserved examples 
Over fifty Class C58s were preserved; C58 239 and C58 363 are operational among them.

Operational
 C58 239: Built June 1940, withdrawn 22 May 1972, preserved from 1 May 1973 in a park in Morioka, Iwate. Restored to working order by JR East and used on steam excursions as the SL Ginga Joyful Train in the north east of Japan from 12 April 2014.
 C58 363: Chichibu Railway, used on Paleo Express steam services

Static
 C58 1: At the Umekoji Steam Locomotive Museum in Kyoto
 C58 5: At "Tochinoki Family Land" in Utsunomiya, Tochigi
 C58 12: In a park in Takamatsu, Kagawa
 C58 16: In a park in Minamisanriku, Miyagi (overturned by 11 March 2011 tsunami)
 C58 19: In a park in Ōsaki, Miyagi
 C58 33: In a park in Kiyosato, Hokkaido

 C58 36: At the municipal library in Mine, Yamaguchi
 C58 48: Torokko Saga Station "19th Century Hall" in Kyoto
 C58 49: In a park in Kakegawa, Shizuoka
 C58 51: In a park in Matsusaka, Mie
 C58 56: At "Poppo Land No. 2" in Fukuchiyama, Kyoto
 C58 66: In "Park Goryo" in Osaka
 C58 82: At a sports centre in Bihoro, Hokkaido
 C58 98: In a park in Fukagawa, Hokkaido
 C58 103: At a culture centre in Ichinoseki, Iwate
 C58 106: In a park in Kushiro, Hokkaido
 C58 112: In a park in Shibushi, Kagoshima
 C58 113: In Maizuru, Kyoto

 C58 114: In a park in Ōsaki, Miyagi
 C58 119: In "SL Park" in Kitami, Hokkaido
 C58 139: In a park in Yūbetsu, Hokkaidō

 C58 170: At the Hidaka Elementary School in Toyooka, Hyogo
 C58 171: In a park in Obama, Fukui
 C58 212: In a park in Tsuruga, Fukui
 C58 215: At Bange Elementary School in Aizubange, Fukushima
 C58 217: In a park in Asahi, Chiba
 C58 228: In a park in Ishinomaki, Miyagi
 C58 231: In a park in Kaminoyama, Yamagata
 C58 244: At the development centre in Tadami, Fukushima

 C58 275: In a park in Kasama, Ibaraki
 C58 277: In a park in Kobayashi, Miyazaki
 C58 280: At an elementary school in Minokamo, Gifu
 C58 295: In a park in Sakaide, Kagawa
 C58 304: In a park in Shinjo, Yamagata
 C58 322: In Mishima, Shizuoka

 C58 333: At JR Shikoku Tadotsu Works in Tadotsu, Kagawa
 C58 335: In Kōchi, Kōchi
 C58 342: In a park in Kitakami, Iwate
 C58 353: In a park in Nachikatsuura, Wakayama
 C58 354: In a park in Rifu, Miyagi
 C58 356: In front of Nakayamadaira-Onsen Station in Ōsaki, Miyagi
 C58 359: In Kameyama Park in Kameyama, Mie
 C58 365: At the Shinkansen General Rolling Stock Centre in Rifu, Miyagi
 C58 389: In front of Tenryū-Futamata Station in Hamamatsu, Shizuoka

 C58 390: In "Kaya SL Park" in Yosano, Kyoto
 C58 395: In Hamura Zoo in Hamura, Tokyo
 C58 407: In Otsukadai Park in Toshima, Tokyo
 C58 414: In a park in Tamaki, Mie

See also
 Japan Railways locomotive numbering and classification
JNR Class C12
JNR Class C63

In Popular Culture 

 The locomotive is featured prominently in the Love Live! Sunshine!! animated music video "HAPPY PARTY TRAIN"

References

External links

 Chichibu Railway Paleo Express 

1067 mm gauge locomotives of Japan
Steam locomotives of Japan
2-6-2 locomotives
Preserved steam locomotives of Japan
Railway locomotives introduced in 1938
Chichibu Railway